The 325th Weapons Squadron is a United States Air Force unit assigned to the USAF Weapons School, stationed at Whiteman Air Force Base, Missouri, it is a geographically separated unit of the 57th Wing at Nellis Air Force Base, Nevada. The mission of the squadron is to provide Northrop Grumman B-2 Spirit instructional flying.

The squadron was first activated as the 325th Bombardment Squadron in  March 1942.  After participating in the antisubmarine campaign while training, it moved to the United Kingdom in August 1942, where it became a training unit for heavy bombers.  From May 1943, it participated in the strategic bombing campaign against Germany.  It earned two Distinguished Unit Citation for its actions.  After V-E Day, it moved to France, performing airlift missions until it was inactivated in 1946.

History

World War II

Initial organization and training
The squadron was activated at Barksdale Field, Louisiana on 1 March 1942, as the 325th Bombardment Squadron, one of the four original squadrons of the 92nd Bombardment Group. Later that month it moved to MacDill Field, Florida and trained with Boeing B-17 Flying Fortresses. While training in Florida, the squadron also flew antisubmarine patrols off the Florida coast. The squadron's air echelon departed Sarasota Army Air Field for Westover Field, Massachusetts on 19 June 1942, flying on to Dow Field, Maine on 29 June. The squadron then ferried their B-17s across the North Atlantic via Newfoundland starting between 12 and 15 August. They flew directly from Newfoundland to Prestwick Airport, Scotland. The 92nd Group was the first to fly their bombers non-stop across the Atlantic. Meanwhile,  the ground echelon left Bradenton on 18 July, arriving at Fort Dix, New Jersey in the New York Port of Embarkation two days later.

Operations in the European Theater
The buildup of Eighth Air Force in England required the establishment of a combat crew replacement and training center, but a lack of qualified personnel and aircraft hampered its development.  As a result, the decision was made to use the 92nd Group and its squadrons as a temporary crew training unit, acting as the main component of what became the 11th Combat Crew Replacement Center Group.  However, the 92d was the first group to arrive in England with improved B-17Fs, and with the training mission came an exchange of these newer models for the older B-17Es of the 97th Bombardment Group to use in training.  On 6 September, to provide the squadron with combat experience, it flew its first combat mission against the Potez aircraft factory at Meaulte, France.  Although remaining a replacement crew training unit until May 1943, the squadron initially flew occasional combat missions.  In January 1943, he squadron moved to RAF Alconbury.

In May 1943, the squadron's training mission was transferred and the 325th began flying combat missions.   Through May 1944 its targets included shipyards at Kiel, ball bearing plants at Schweinfurt, submarine pens at Wilhelmshaven, a tire manufacturing plant at Hannover, airfields near Paris, an aircraft factory at Nantes and a magnesium mine in Norway.

During the summer of 1943, the squadron began experimenting with H2S, a radar bombing system developed by the Royal Air Force.  In August 1943, VIII Bomber Command established a new unit, the 482d Bombardment Group at Alconbury that was dedicated to the pathfinder mission.  The squadron transferred its trained personnel and H2S-equipped B-17Fs to the 482d's 813th Bombardment Squadron.

The squadron earned a Distinguished Unit Citation on 11 January 1944, when it successfully bombed aircraft manufacturing factories in Oschersleben, Germany despite adverse weather, a lack of fighter protection and heavy flak.  It participated in Big Week, the intensive attack against German aircraft industry in late February 1944.  It took part in Operation Crossbow, attacks on launch sites for V-1 flying bombs and V-2 rockets.  It struck airfields and industrial sites in France, Belgium, the Netherlands, and Germany.  After October 1944 it concentrated on transportation and oil industry targets.  On 11 September, it earned a second DUC for a mission against petroleum facilities at Merseburg. 

In addition to its strategic bombing mission, the squadron flew interdiction and air support missions.  During Operation Overlord, the Normandy invasion, it attacked coastal defenses, transportation junctions and marshalling yards near the beachhead. It provided air support for Operation Cobra, the Allied breakout at Saint Lo, It bombed bridges and gun positions to support Operation Market Garden, the airborne attacks in the Netherlands near Arnhem, to secure bridgeheads across the Rhine in September.  During the Battle of the Bulge, from December 1944 to January 1945, it attacked bridges and marshalling yards near the target area.  During Operation Varsity, the airborne assault across the Rhine, it provided cover by bombing airfields near the drop zone.  It flew its last combat mission on 25 April 1945, when the 92nd Group led the entire Eighth Air Force formation in an attack on Plzeň.

Following V-E Day, the squadron moved to Istres Air Base, France, where it participated in the Green Project, transporting troops returning to the United States, flying them to Cazes Field in Morocco until September, returning French servicemen to France on return trips.  During the winter it flew displaced Greek nationals from Munich to Athens.  It was inactivated in France on 28 February 1946 and its remaining personnel were absorbed into elements of the 306th Bombardment Group at Lechfeld Air Base, Germany.

Strategic Air Command
Reactivated as a Strategic Air Command Boeing B-29 Superfortress squadron in July 1946.  Performed strategic bombardment training until 1950; being deployed to Far East Air Forces and flying combat missions over North Korea.  Under control of the FEAF Bomber Command (Provisional) until 20 October, the squadron bombed factories, refineries, iron works, hydroelectric plants, airfields, bridges, tunnels, troop concentrations, barracks, marshalling yards, road junctions, rail lines, supply dumps, docks, vehicles and other strategic and interdiction targets. Returned to Fairchild Air Force Base, Spokane, Washington in late October and November 1950.

Re-equipped with Convair B-36 Peacemaker intercontinental strategic bomber in 1951.  Engaged in training operations on a worldwide scale; being upgraded to Boeing B-52 Stratofortress in 1957 standing nuclear alert until being stood down in 1992 at the end of the Cold War.

Weapons squadron
Reactivated as a Northrop Grumman B-2 Spirit bomb squadron in 1998.    Taken off operational flying status, being redesignated as a weapons training squadron at Whiteman in 2005, assuming assets on inactivated 715th Weapons Squadron.

Lineage
 Constituted as the 325th Bombardment Squadron (Heavy) on 28 January 1942
 Activated on 1 March 1942
 Redesignated 325th Bombardment Squadron, Heavy on 29 September 1944
 Inactivated on 28 February 1946
 Redesignated 325th Bombardment Squadron, Very Heavy on 15 July 1946
 Activated on 4 August 1946
 Redesignated 325th Bombardment Squadron, Medium on 28 May 1948
 Redesignated 325th Bombardment Squadron, Heavy on 16 June 1951
 Redesignated 325th Bomb Squadron on 1 September 1991
 Inactivated on 1 July 1994
 Activated on 6 January 1998
 Redesignated 325th Weapons Squadron 9 September 2005
 Activated on 9 September 2005

Assignments
 92d Bombardment Group, 1 March 1942 – 28 February 1946 (non-operational 20 August–15 September 1943)
 92d Bombardment Group, 4 August 1946 (attached to 92d Bombardment Wing after 16 February 1951)
 92d Bombardment Wing (later 92d Strategic Aerospace Wing, 92d Bombardment Wing), 16 June 1952
 92d Operations Group, 1 September 1991 – 1 July 1994
 509th Operations Group, 6 January 1998
 USAF Weapons School, 9 September 2005 – present

Stations

 Barksdale Field, Louisiana, 1 March 1942
 MacDill Field, Florida, 26 March 1942
 Sarasota Army Air Field, Florida, 18 May–July 1942
 RAF Bovingdon (AAF-112), England, August 1942
 RAF Alconbury (AAF-102), England, January 1943
 RAF Podington (AAF-109), England, 15 September 1943
 Istres Air Base (Y-17), France, June 1945 – 28 February 1946
 Fort Worth Army Air Field, Texas, 4 August 1946
 Smoky Hill Army Air Field, Kansas, 26 October 1946
 Spokane Army Air Field (later Spokane Air Force Base, Fairchild Air Force Base), Washington, 20 June 1947 – 1 July 1994 (deployed to Yokota Air Base, Japan, 9 July29 October 1950, Andersen Air Force Base, Guam, 16 October 1954 – 12 January 1955 and 26 April–5 July 1956)
 Whiteman Air Force Base, Missouri, 6 January 1998 – present

Aircraft

 Boeing B-17 Flying Fortress, 1942–1946
 Boeing B-29 Superfortress, 1946, 1947–1951
 Convair B-36 Peacemaker, 1951–1957
 Boeing B-52 Stratofortress, 1957–1994
 Northrop Grumman B-2 Spirit, 1998–2005

See also

 List of B-52 Units of the United States Air Force

References

Notes
 Explanatory notes

 Citations

Bibliography

 
 
 
 
 
 
 

Weapons 0325
Military units and formations established in 1942
1942 establishments in Louisiana